Foreigners in the Homeland: The Spanish American New Novel in Spain, 1962-1974  is a 2000 book by Mario Santana. The book is about the reception of the Latin American Boom. The book was reviewed in several academic journals including the Latin American Literary Review Press, Hispania, Modern Language Review, and Iberoamericana.

References 

Books about South America
2000 non-fiction books
Books about literature